Shoshonea is a monotypic genus of flowering plants belonging to the family Apiaceae. Its only species is Shoshonea pulvinata.

Its native range is Western Central USA.

References

Apioideae
Monotypic Apioideae genera